Kelvin Joseph Jr (born November 11, 1999) is an American football cornerback for the Dallas Cowboys of the National Football League (NFL). He was drafted by the Cowboys in the second round of the 2021 NFL Draft. He played college football at LSU and Kentucky.

Early years
Joseph grew up in Baton Rouge, Louisiana, and attended Scotlandville Magnet High School. As a junior, he tallied 67 tackles, 3 interceptions (2 returned for touchdowns) and 12 pass breakups, while contributing to the team winning the 5A state title. He received All-District, District 4-5A Co-Defensive MVP, All-Metro and Class 5A All-state honors.

As a senior, he had 113 tackles, 12 tackles for loss and three interceptions. He was named class 5A All-State and played in the All-American Bowl. He scored a combined 13 touchdowns, from punts, kickoffs and interception returns over the course of his high school career. He also practiced basketball and was a teammate of Javonte Smart.

Joseph committed to play college football at LSU over offers from Alabama, Florida State, Auburn, and Florida.

College career
As a true freshman, he played in 11 games, making 12 tackles and breaking up a pass. He had 4 tackles against the University of Mississippi. He entered the transfer portal after being suspended from playing in the 2019 Fiesta Bowl for violating team rules, but later withdrew his name and participated in LSU's spring practices. Joseph re-entered the transfer portal in July 2019 and announced that he would be transferring to the University of Kentucky the following month.

Joseph sat out his sophomore year due to NCAA transfer rules. As a redshirt sophomore, he started in 9 games and was a part of a defense that had 5 players selected in the 2021 NFL Draft. He recorded 9 starts, 25 tackles, a tackle for loss, one pass breakup and tied for second in the SEC with four interceptions in his only season of playing time with the Wildcats. He opted out of the last game left in the regular season, in order to focus on preparing for the 2021 NFL Draft.

Professional career

Joseph was selected by the Dallas Cowboys in the second round (44th overall) of the 2021 NFL Draft. He signed his four-year rookie contract with Dallas on June 10, 2021. He was placed on injured reserve on September 2, 2021, to start the season. He was activated on October 30.

Personal life
Joseph has released rap records under the pseudonym "YKDV Bossman Fat".  YKDV stands for "You Know Da Vibe".

In April 2022, Dallas police announced that they were seeking to speak with Joseph as a "person of interest" in their investigation of a fatal shooting that had occurred in March. Video footage of an altercation at a nightclub in the city's Lower Greenville neighborhood that preceded the murder showed that one of the men involved was wearing a "YKDV" necklace.  In an interview with the Dallas Morning News on April 15, an attorney stated that Joseph was not the shooter but was a passenger in the vehicle from which the fatal shots were fired. A day after Joseph met with investigators, two men from his hometown of Baton Rouge were arrested in connection with the incident.

References

External links
LSU Tigers bio
Kentucky Wildcats bio

1999 births
Living people
Players of American football from Baton Rouge, Louisiana
American football cornerbacks
Kentucky Wildcats football players
LSU Tigers football players
African-American players of American football
Dallas Cowboys players
21st-century African-American sportspeople